Kurzawka  (German Kuschofka, Kuschowka, 1939–1945 Kuschhofen; Silesian Kuszówka) is a settlement belonging to the sołectwo of Raszowa in the administrative district of Gmina Leśnica, within Strzelce County, Opole Voivodeship, in south-western Poland.

References

Kurzawka